USS Sampson (DDG-102) is an  in the United States Navy. Funding for the Flight IIA (5"/62, one 20mm CIWS variant) ship was authorized in 2002 and her keel was laid on 20 March 2005. She is the fourth US Navy ship named to honor Rear Admiral William T. Sampson.

She was built by Bath Iron Works in Bath, Maine. At her christening on 16 September 2006, the principal address was delivered by Senator Susan Collins of Maine, and the vessel was christened by Clara Parsons, great-granddaughter of Rear Admiral Sampson and daughter of William Sterling Parsons, as the ship's sponsor.

History
She was commissioned in Boston, Massachusetts on 3 November 2007 and home ported in San Diego. Her maiden deployment was from October 2009 to May 2010 to the Western Pacific and Persian Gulf as part of the  carrier strike group (CSG).

After Sampson returned from an 8-month maiden deployment, she was back underway from May to August with port visits to the 103rd Portland Rose Festival and Esquimalt, British Columbia to celebrate the 100th anniversary of the Royal Canadian Navy. She then participated in Exercise RIMPAC off the coast of Hawaii. Sampsons crew was awarded two Sea Service Ribbons in 12 months.

In August 2011 Sampson pulled into South Harbor in Seattle, Washington, to participate in Seattle's Seafair celebration. In September, Sampson dispatched an inflatable boat and swimmers to retrieve about 60 bales of assorted drugs from the ocean after a small boat dumped them overboard. After that the ship participated in 's Composite Training Unit Exercise (COMPTUEX), in preparation for an independent deployment. In February 2012 Sampson departed San Diego for a scheduled deployment to the western Pacific and Middle East. In July, Sampson participated in at-sea phase of Cooperation Afloat Readiness and Training (CARAT) Singapore.

On 29 December 2014, Sampson was dispatched to the Java Sea to search for Indonesia AirAsia Flight 8501 that disappeared the day before.

In 2016 the ship remained assigned to Destroyer Squadron 23, working with Carrier Strike Group 11. She arrived at her new homeport, Naval Station Everett in Washington, on 26 September 2016.

The Royal New Zealand Navy (RNZN) invited the United States Navy to send a vessel to participate in the RNZN's 75th Birthday Celebrations in Auckland over the weekend of 19–21 November 2016. Sampson was the first US warship to visit New Zealand in 33 years since the New Zealand nuclear-free zone came into effect and the US suspended its obligations to New Zealand under the ANZUS treaty. New Zealand Prime Minister John Key granted approval for the ship's visit under the New Zealand's anti-nuclear law, which requires that the Prime Minister has to be satisfied that any visiting ship is not nuclear armed or powered. Soon after arriving in New Zealand, a magnitude 7.8 earthquake struck Kaikoura. Sampson along with other navy ships from Australia, Canada, Japan and Singapore were dispatched directly to the area to provide humanitarian assistance.

On 3 October 2017, Sampson departed her homeport for a scheduled deployment with the  CSG. She returned 9 May 2018 after seven months.

In January 2022, Sampson responded to Tonga to provide assistance following the Hunga Tonga–Hunga Ha'apai eruption and tsunami.

Sampson participated in RIMPAC 2022.

Awards

 Navy Unit Commendation – (July 2009 – March 2010)
 Battle "E" – (2010, 2011, 2014, 2015, 2016, 2017, 2018)
 Humanitarian Service Medal – (17–20 November 2016) 2016 Kaikoura earthquake
 Spokane Trophy Award – (2010)
 Arizona Memorial Trophy – (2011–2012)
 Retention Excellence Award – (2008, 2014, 2017)
 Vice Admiral Thomas H. Copeman III Material Readiness Award – (2014)
 Safety Excellence Award – (2010, 2011, 2015, 2016, 2017, 2019)

In popular culture
 The ship is featured in the 2012 film Battleship where she is destroyed and sunk by aliens during the intense combat in the Pacific Ocean off the coast of Hawaii with its sister ship .

Gallery

References

Further reading
 Soundings, 20 September 2006, Vol. 33, No. 38, pages 12–13 – www.soundingsnews.com.

External links

 

 

Arleigh Burke-class destroyers
Ships built in Bath, Maine
2006 ships